Erik Joal Meek (born January 17, 1973) is an American former professional basketball player who played for four seasons at Duke University.

College career
Meek played college basketball for Duke from 1991 to 1995. He was part of the team that won the 1992 NCAA Tournament. During his junior season he achieved his career high in scoring with 21 points against Boston University. Meek was named captain of the Blue Devils for the 1994–95 season. During that season he appeared in 31 games averaging 10.3 points, 8.3 rebounds and 1.3 blocks per game on 28.7 minutes per game. He finished his career in Duke averaging 5.1 points, 4.3 rebounds and 0.6 blocks per game.

Professional career
Meek was drafted 44th overall by the Houston Rockets, in the 1995 NBA Draft. He did not play in the NBA, but he spent several years playing professionally in Europe.

Personal life
Meek is the cousin of former Tampa Bay Rays closer Heath Bell.

References

External links
Euroleague.net Profile
FIBA Europe Profile
ProBallers.com Profile
Eurobasket.com Profile
ACB.com Profile  
TheDraftReview.com Profile

1973 births
Living people
American expatriate basketball people in Greece
American expatriate basketball people in Spain
American expatriate basketball people in Turkey
American men's basketball players
Apollon Patras B.C. players
Basketball players from San Diego
Centers (basketball)
Duke Blue Devils men's basketball players
Galatasaray S.K. (men's basketball) players
Greek Basket League players
Houston Rockets draft picks
Iraklis Thessaloniki B.C. players
Liga ACB players
Maroussi B.C. players
Parade High School All-Americans (boys' basketball)
Peristeri B.C. players
Power forwards (basketball)
Real Madrid Baloncesto players